Rachael Kaki Nyamai is a Kenyan politician. She is  a member of  parliament for Kitui south constituency in Kitui County under Jubilee Party.

Early years and education 
Nyamai was born  in 1976 in Kitui county. She had her primary and secondary education at Kyatune primary school and Muthale Girls High school for her secondary education respectively. She furthered her education at Kenyatta University where she acquired a bachelor's degree in Education and master's degree in sociology. Between 2006 and 2009, she attended the University of Aarhus in Danish School of Education in Denmark to study a Doctor of Philosophy (PhD).

Career 
She was a lecturer at Kenyatta University and South Eastern University college of Kitui. She was elected to the 11th parliament in 2013 on a NARC party ticket and in 2017 She won re-election on Jubilee party. She is the current Member of Parliament for Kitui South constituency ( for 7 years), and a  member of the National Assembly Liaison Committee and the House Business Committee.

Personal life 
She is married to Titus Mavui Ngumu with children. She released a gospel song in collaboration with Justus Myello. She is also a staunch Christian and a church elder.

References

Living people
Members of the National Assembly (Kenya)
Kenyan women in politics
Year of birth missing (living people)
Members of the 11th Parliament of Kenya
Members of the 12th Parliament of Kenya
Members of the 13th Parliament of Kenya
People from Kitui County
21st-century Kenyan politicians
21st-century Kenyan women politicians